The Innovia APM 100 (formerly known as the CX-100) is an automated people mover (APM) rolling stock first developed by Westinghouse (later Adtranz, Bombardier Transportation, and now Alstom), intended mainly for airport connections and light rail in towns. They are operated by Automatic Train Control (ATC), making it fully automatic and driverless.

The Innovia APM 100 is an evolution of Westinghouse's previous people mover vehicle, the C-100. Bombardier's intended successor to the Innovia APM 100 is the Innovia APM 200 (originally simply known as the Innovia), which made its debut on Dallas-Fort Worth International Airport's Skylink APM. However, the Innovia APM 100 continues to be offered by Bombardier and will remain in service at many airports for years to come. In addition to being used at many airports, the Innovia APM 100 is used on the Miami Metromover which runs throughout Downtown Miami, Florida, United States.

History

The Innovia 100 APM people mover vehicle is a modern version of the Westinghouse C-100 people mover first built by the Westinghouse Electric Corporation.  Westinghouse developed the technology in the early 1960s.  They built the Transit Expressway Revenue Line in Pittsburgh, Pennsylvania as a prototype to demonstrate their people mover technology in 1965.  Westinghouse marketed the people mover system as an urban transit system and had hoped to build a fully-functioning system in Pittsburgh.  However, political leaders held opposing views on the prospects of a rubber-tired mass transit system and plans to implement this system were rejected. 

Despite this, Westinghouse would see success with their people mover system at airports.  In 1966, they were contracted to build a people mover system for the new terminal at Tampa International Airport.  This would be the first time an automated people mover system was used to transport passengers within an airport terminal.  The Tampa airport system included eight first-generation Westinghouse C-100 vehicles when it opened in 1971.  Two years later, Westinghouse completed its second airport people mover system, the Satellite Transit System, at Seattle-Tacoma International Airport.  

In 1980, Westinghouse people mover systems were opened at Miami International Airport and Hartsfield Atlanta International Airport.  The system in Atlanta (known today as The Plane Train), is one of the world's most heavily used people mover systems in the world.  These systems used second generation C-100 vehicles, which has been the primary design of the vehicle ever since.  The C-100 would be installed at more airports throughout the 1980s. 

In 1986, the Westinghouse C-100 made its debut on its first urban people mover system, the Metromover in Miami, Florida. 

In 1988, Westinghouse sold its transportation division to Germany company AEG, which merged into a joint venture of ABB and Daimler Benz named Adtranz in 1996. Adtranz continued production on the C-100, which was marketed as the Adtranz C-100 and subsequently the Adtranz CX-100.   

Adtranz was acquired by Bombardier in 2001, who then rebranded the vehicle as the Bombardier CX-100.  Bombardier has since rebranded the CX-100 again to its current name, the Innovia APM 100, to bring all of their people mover models under the same branding.

While most of the earlier C-100s have been retired and replaced with Innovia APM 100s, London Stansted Airport still uses 5 C-100 vehicles on its Track Transit System. 4 C-100s are also preserved on display in museums:  2 vehicles from the Miami Metromover are preserved at the Gold Coast Railroad Museum and 2 from the Hartsfield-Jackson Atlanta International Airport system are  preserved at the Southeastern Railway Museum.

Airport connections

A popular rolling stock for intra-terminal connection in large airports, it operates in a number of airports:

Urban lines

Miami Metromover

The Bombardier Innovia APM 100 is used on the Metromover in Miami, Florida, United States. This was the first application of Westinghouse's people mover technology outside of an airport.  The system's original Westinghouse C-100s were replaced with the current Innovia APM 100s in 2008. The Metromover remains one of the world's few rail systems that uses the Innovia APM 100 for non-airport operations.

Bukit Panjang LRT

The Innovia APM 100 (C801) began operations on the Bukit Panjang LRT Line in 1999. These cars are similar to the C-100s formerly used at Singapore Changi Airport's Skytrain system in the early 1990s, jointly built by Westinghouse and Adtranz (acquired by Bombardier). Most of the new features available in newer MRT train cars are found here as well.

Instead of metal wheels on metal tracks, rubber-tired wheels on a concrete track are used, which makes it run very quiet. The windows are smart glass and are programmed to automatically mist within  of (mostly) HDB apartment blocks ensuring residents' privacy. 19 individual cars (which can be coupled in pairs if necessary during peak hours) were purchased.

The line suffered numerous technical problems in its initial years, and subsequent LRT lines in Singapore used the Crystal Mover instead. SMRT also announced that they will upgrade the LRT system with full cost paid by the company.

13 more trainsets for the Bukit Panjang LRT Line (C801A) have been progressively introduced since late-2014 to ease the 100% peak hour congestion. As of 4 September 2015, all C801A trains are on revenue service.

Guangzhou APM Line

The Zhujiang New Town Automated People Mover System, or officially known as the Guangzhou Metro APM Line, is operated by a fleet of 14 Innovia APM 100 rolling stock. It serves the Zhujiang New Town area in Guangzhou, the new CBD of the city. The system began operations in November 2010 and is completely underground. In terms of construction cost per kilometre, it is the most expensive APM system in the world, yet it is the shortest and least used line in the Guangzhou Metro network.

Technical specifications
 System operation: Automatic train control (ATC) under automatic train operation (ATO) GoA level 4 (UTO)
 CITYFLO 550 fixed block signalling
 CITYFLO 650 moving block communications-based train control (CBTC)
 Gauge:  central guideway with rubber tyres
 Maximum speed: 
 Traction control: Thyristor drive powering two Bombardier 1460-P4 DC motors, each with a continuous rating of 
 Capacity: 105 (22 seating, 83 standing)
 Unladen weight: 

See also
 Bombardier Guided Light Transit
 Innovia APM – automated people mover systems
 Crystal Mover – a competing APM rolling stock by Mitsubishi Heavy Industries

References

External links
 
 Bombardier Transportations : Bukit Panjang LRT CX-100

Innovia APM 100
Innovia APM 100
Light Rail Transit (Singapore) rolling stock
Electric multiple units of the United States
Electric multiple units of Great Britain
Electric multiple units of Spain
Rolling stock of Singapore
Multiple units of Malaysia
Electric multiple units of China
Electric multiple units of Germany
Electric railcars and multiple units of Italy
Bombardier Transportation multiple units